Bradford Lyttle (born November 20, 1927) is an American pacifist and peace activist. He was an organizer with the Committee for Non-Violent Action of several major campaigns against militarism, including "Omaha Action", against land-based nuclear missiles (1959) and "Polaris Action" against submarine-based nuclear missiles (1960). Lyttle and several others walked from San Francisco to New York City, and then through parts of Europe to Moscow, Russia, from December 1960 until late 1961. The action was called the San Francisco to Moscow March for Peace. Several participants, including Lyttle, walked the entire distance. He also walked in the Quebec-Washington-Guantanamo Peace Walk (1963).

In 1965 Lyttle gave lectures on 'Non-Violent resistance' for the newly founded Free University of New York.

Among his theoretical works are a 1958 pamphlet presenting the case for nonviolent national defense against aggression; and a mathematical formula called "The Apocalypse Equation", which argues that, over time, the probability of nuclear missiles being used approaches 100%.
Lyttle claimed that a University of Chicago statistician had checked his work on the "Apocalypse Equation."
In Note 21 to his Presidential Address to the American Statistical Association published in 1988, University of Chicago Statistics Professor William Kruskal mentions Lyttle's "Apocalypse Equation" as an example of the error of casually assuming the independence of events when calculating the probability of a resultant event over time, as an example which "stretches to the limit … the appropriateness of probabilistic data."

He is also the founder and perennial candidate for the office of President of the United States of the United States Pacifist Party. He ran as a write-in candidate in the 1984, 1996, and 2000 elections, and on the ballot in the state of Colorado in 2008.  In 2008 Lyttle came in second to last of sixteen candidates in Colorado for which he received 110 votes, beating only Gene Amondson of the Prohibition Party.  In Colorado, Amondson came in last place among all candidates with ballot access (though Amondson won enough votes elsewhere to surpass Lyttle's total nationally).

Lyttle has been arrested for nonviolent peaceful demonstrations many times. In 1996, Lyttle, Civil Rights Movement historian Randy Kryn, David Dellinger, and Abbie Hoffman's son, Andrew, were among eleven people arrested for a sit-in at the Chicago Federal Building during the first Democratic National Convention held in Chicago since 1968.

Works
 National Defense Thru Nonviolent Resistance (1958)
 Essays on Nonviolent Action (1959)
 Peace and independence for South Vietnam: By nonviolent resistance or guerilla warfare? (1965)
 You Come With Naked Hands: The Story of the San Francisco to Moscow March for Peace (1966)
 The Chicago Anti-Vietnam War Movement (1988)
 Peace Activist: The Autobiography of Bradford Lyttle (Kindle Edition 2014)
 The Flaw in Deterrence (2017)

See also
List of peace activists

References

1927 births
Living people
American pacifists
American tax resisters
Candidates in the 2008 United States presidential election
Candidates in the 2016 United States presidential election
21st-century American politicians
Activists from Chicago
War Resisters League activists
Politicians from Chicago